{{DISPLAYTITLE:C3H6OS}}
The molecular formula C3H6OS (molar mass: 90.14 g/mol, exact mass: 90.0139 u) may refer to:

 syn-Propanethial-S-oxide, or (Z)-propanethial S-oxide
 S-Methyl thioacetate